Ted King may refer to:
 Teddy King (1884–1952), English footballer who played for Leicester City
 Ted King (cyclist) (born 1983), American cyclist
 Ted King (actor) (born 1965), American actor